Bladen Community College is a public community college in Dublin, North Carolina. It is part of the North Carolina Community College System and serves Bladen County.

History
Bladen Community College was established on October 5, 1967, as Bladen Technical Institute, and chartered on January 14, 1971, under the authority of North Carolina General Statute 115A. Their athletic program is known as the Eagles.

Accreditation
Bladen Community College is accredited by the Commission on Colleges of the Southern Association of Colleges and Schools to award associate degrees, diplomas, and certificates.

College information
Bladen Community College offers post-secondary certificates, diplomas, and degree programs.

References

External links
Official website

Two-year colleges in the United States
North Carolina Community College System colleges
Vocational education in the United States
Education in Bladen County, North Carolina
Educational institutions established in 1967
Universities and colleges accredited by the Southern Association of Colleges and Schools
Buildings and structures in Bladen County, North Carolina
1967 establishments in North Carolina